The  North Carolina Local Government Commission is a part of the North Carolina Department of State Treasurer which was created after the Great Depression to assist local North Carolina governments in decision making involving large financing projects such as bond issues. The commission is chaired by the North Carolina State Treasurer.

Responsibilities 
The Local Government Commission is responsible for approving, selling, and delivering all North Carolina bonds and notes. In August 2021 legislation was passed which granted the commission the authority to revoke the incorporation of financially-troubled municipalities.

History 
The commission was involved in the controversial Carolina Crossroads project near Roanoke Rapids, North Carolina and was criticized for lack of rigor in its evaluation of the proposal. In February 1997 the board assumed control over the finances of Princeville, the first time it had ever taken over the finances of a municipality. In December 2021, it voted to revoke the incorporation of East Laurinburg, effective June 2022, the first time it ever used this authority, after finding evidence of impropriety in the town's financial management.

References

Further reading
 Coe, Charles K. (2007). Preventing Local Government Fiscal Crises: The North Carolina Approach. Public Budgeting & Finance, Volume 27, Issue 3, pages 39–49, Fall 2007. 
 
 Fesler, James W. (1941). North Carolina's local government commission. National Municipal Review, Volume 30, Issue 6, pages 327–334, June 1941.

External links
Official site

Government of North Carolina
Local government in North Carolina
State and local government commissions in the United States